Storytelling is an album by the Brazilian musician Naná Vasconcelos. It was released in 1995.

Production
Recorded in 1992 and 1993, the album was produced in part by Vasconcelos. Many of the songs are about the Amazon rainforest; others are semi-autobiographical. Vasconcelos added found sounds to the music. He employed more electronic effects than on previous albums, although he still made use of the berimbau. "Curtain" was cowritten by the Ambitious Lovers' Peter Scherer.

Critical reception

The Guardian wrote: "There are string quartets, choirs, children's voices, the berimbau, gongs, accordions, talking drums, the works. The atmosphere he evokes is of the street-corner, the forest, cattle in fields. It isn't jazz, but Vasconcelos is an improviser to the tips of his fingers, and understands the impulses of improvisers from whatever roots they spring." The Orange County Register deemed the album "a mesmerizing blend of Afro-Brazilian-jazz-global grooves"; it later named it one of the best albums of 1995. The Omaha World-Herald opined that "some samba rhythms provide brief interest, but mostly the music wanders somewhat aimlessly."

AllMusic called the music "often sweet and charming, and just as often thoughtful and engaging—never boring, annoying, or mediocre; it's also impossible to pigeonhole." The Miami Herald labeled Storytelling "beautiful," writing that "Vasconcelos takes listeners on an ambient journey deep into the Amazon."

Track listing

References

Naná Vasconcelos albums
1995 albums
Albums by Brazilian artists